Wang Zhigang (born October 1957) is a Chinese information engineer who currently serves as Minister of Science and Technology since March 2018. Previously, he served as general manager of China Electronics Technology Group Corporation, a state-owned military industrial complex.

He is a member of the 19th CPC Central Committee and a former member of the 18th CPC Central Committee. He is a member of the 19th National Congress of the Chinese Communist Party.

Biography
Wang was born in Dingyuan County, Anhui in October 1957. In January 1976, during the late Down to the Countryside Movement, he was a sent-down youth in Changshan Commune of Chuzhou. In October 1978 he was accepted to Xidian University and graduated in July 1982.

After graduation, he assigned to the Ministry of Electronics Industry as an engineer. He spent 14 years working there before serving as general manager of China National Software. He joined the Chinese Communist Party in December 1986. In February 1999 he was promoted to become the vice-president of CAEIT, a position he held until January 2002. In January 2002 he became the deputy general manager of China Electronics Technology Group Corporation, rising to general manager in September 2003. In April 2011, he was appointed vice-minister of Science and Technology, he remained in that position until March 2018, when he was elevated to the Minister position.

References 

1957 births
Politicians from Chuzhou
Living people
Engineers from Anhui
Xidian University alumni
Central Party School of the Chinese Communist Party alumni
People's Republic of China politicians from Anhui
Chinese Communist Party politicians from Anhui
Ministers of Science and Technology of the People's Republic of China